The Limerick County Board of the Gaelic Athletic Association (GAA) or Limerick GAA is one of the 32 county boards of the GAA in Ireland, and is responsible for Gaelic games in County Limerick. The county board is also responsible for the Limerick county teams.

The county hurling team are the current All-Ireland Senior Hurling Championship (SHC) title holders, and have the fourth highest total of titles, behind Kilkenny, Cork and Tipperary. The county football team was the first from the province of Munster both to win an All-Ireland Senior Football Championship (SFC), as well as to appear in the final.

As of 2009, there were 108 clubs affiliated to Limerick GAA — the third highest, alongside Antrim.

Hurling

Clubs

Clubs contest the following competitions:
 Limerick Senior Hurling Championship
 Limerick Intermediate Hurling Championship
 Limerick Junior Hurling Championship
 Limerick Minor Hurling Championship
 Limerick Under-21 Hurling Championship

The senior competition's most successful club is Patrickswell, with 20 titles. Ahane has 19 titles.

County team

Limerick's first outright success in hurling was achieved when the Kilfinane club defeated Kilkenny GAA club Tullaroan in the final of the 1897 All-Ireland Senior Hurling Championship (SHC). At that time, counties were represented by champion clubs.

Limerick won the 1918 All-Ireland SHC, then repeated the feat in the 1921 All-Ireland SHC when the team won the inaugural Liam MacCarthy Cup. The team that achieved those wins featured many players who contested eight consecutive Munster Senior Hurling Championship (SHC) finals (1917–1924 inclusive), a record that has never been equalled.

The team won five consecutive National Hurling League (NHL) titles during the 1930s, a record still unequalled. Those titles were won in 1933–34, 1934–35, 1935–36, 1936–37 and 1937–38. Limerick also won four consecutive Munster SHC titles, and remains the only team other than Cork to have done so. After winning All-Ireland SHC titles in 1934 and in 1936, another All-Ireland SHC title followed in 1940. The team from this era did much to raise the profile of the sport: whereas around 30,000 people attended the 1930 All-Ireland SHC Final, attendances had risen to 50,000 by the 1940 final and players such as the Mackeys (John and Mick), Ryans (Timmy and Mick), Clohesseys (Dave and Paddy), Bob McConkey and Paddy Scanlon were recalled for decades afterwards. Victory in 1940 left Limerick with six All-Ireland SHC titles and as the only team from outside the "big three" (Cork, Tipperary and Kilkenny) to have won more than one All-Ireland SHC title. Dublin had at that stage also six All-Ireland SHC titles but no native of that county had played on any of its winning teams. Limerick won a sixth NHL title in 1946–47 but success soon became a rarity.

Limerick won the 1970–71 NHL title and soon followed this by winning the 1973 All-Ireland SHC, its seventh title. Four further NHL titles followed that century: 1983–84, 1984–85, 1991–92 and, lastly, 1997.

The 2018 season concluded with Limerick winning the 2018 All-Ireland SHC, the team's first since 1973, with a 3–16 to 2–18 point defeat of Galway in the final. The team built on this success, winning the NHL in 2019 and 2020, the Munster SHC in 2019, 2020, 2021 and 2022 and the All-Ireland SHC again in 2020, 2021 and 2022.

Football

Clubs

Clubs contest the Limerick Senior Football Championship. That competition's most successful club is Claughaun with 14 titles.

County team

Limerick won the very first All-Ireland Senior Football Championship in 1887 and repeated this success in 1896, when it became the first non-Leinster team to beat the then all-conquering Dublin in a championship match.

Limerick currently play in Division 2 of the National Football League.

Between 1953 and 1964, Limerick did not play in the Munster Football Championship.

Camogie

Limerick contested the All-Ireland Senior Camogie Championship final of 1980, losing to Cork in a replay. They first contested Munster championship in 1922-4, but the game struggled and had to undergo further revivals in 1932, 1947 and 1960, when Chris O'Connell, Carrie Gillane and Eithne Neville re-established it. This culminated in the county team's appearance in the All-Ireland Junior Camogie Championship of 1977 and Limerick's appearance in the All-Ireland Senior Camogie Championship final of 1980, where they lost to Cork in a replay. Three Limerick clubs have won the All-Ireland Senior Club Camogie Championship, Granagh-Ballingarry (3), Ballyagran (1978) and Croagh Kilfinny(1975).

Notable players include All Star award winners Rose Collins, Eileen O'Brien and Vera Sheehan,
young player of the year for 2007 Niamh Mulcahy. and Vera Mackey, Agnes Hourigan from Ballingarry and Eithne Neville from Kilfinny who won All-Ireland Senior Camogie Championship medals with Dublin in 1938 and 1957 respectively. Chris O'Connell and Agnes Hourigan served as president of the Camogie Association.

Under Camogie's National Development Plan 2010-2015, "Our Game, Our Passion", five new camogie clubs were to be established in the county by 2015.

Limerick have the following achievements in camogie.

 All-Ireland Senior Camogie Championship Runners-Up 1980
 All-Ireland Intermediate Camogie Championship Winners 1996, 2007, 2014  Runners-Up 2000, 2002, 2013
 All-Ireland Junior Camogie Championship Winners 1977, 1995 Runners-Up 1988, 1994, Junior A Winners 2014
 National Camogie League Runners-Up 1978, 1979, 2002
 National Camogie League Div 2/Junior Winners 1991, 1992, 1996, 2007, 2013, Div 4 Winners 2014
 All-Ireland Minor Camogie Championship A Winners 2014, B Winners 2009, 2011
 All Ireland under-16 B Winners 2001, 2002, 2011

Ladies' football
Limerick has a ladies' football team.

References

External links

 Limerick GAA site
 Limerick on Hoganstand.com
 National and provincial titles won by Limerick teams
 Fr. Casey's GAA Club, Abbeyfeale
 Milford GAA Club, Castletroy, Limerick
 Mountcollins Gaa Club

 
Gaelic games governing bodies in Munster